The Closing Chronicles (subtitled: The Breathing Shadow II) is the second studio album by the Swedish rock band Nightingale, released by Black Mark Production in 1996. The album continues the story begun on The Breathing Shadow. This is the first album to feature Dag Swanö (with alias "Tom Nouga") on guitars and keyboards, as well as produce the album.

Track listing
"Deep Inside of Nowhere" - 7:12
"Revival" - 4:24
"Thoughts from a Stolen Soul" - 9:00
"So Long (Still I Wonder)" – 4:47
"Steal the Moon" - 3:17
"Intermezzo" - 4:22
"Alive Again" - 9:26
 The Release
 Shadowland Revisited
 Breathless

Credits
Nightingale
 Dan Swanö - vocals, guitars, keyboards, drums
 Dag Swanö - guitars, keyboards, bass guitar

Production and design
 Dag Swanö - producer
 Dan Swanö - engineering, mixing
 Peter In de Betou - mastering
 Juha Vuorma - cover art
 Maren Lotz - design, layout
 Anders Storm - photography
 Börje Forsberg - executive producer

References

Nightingale (band) albums
1996 albums